Pygmaeopsis viticola is a species of beetle in the family Cerambycidae, and the only species in the genus Pygmaeopsis. It was described by Schaeffer in 1908.

References

Pogonocherini
Beetles described in 1908